Lis Lewis is an American voice teacher, author and performance coach. Lewis's clients include Miguel, Gwen Stefani, Rihanna, Courtney Love, Britney Spears, Colbie Caillat, Linkin Park, Demi Lovato, Tyson Ritter of The All-American Rejects, The Pussycat Dolls, Bryson Tiller, Iggy Azalea, and Jack Black.

Musical background
Lewis grew up in New York City and began training as a child at the Dalcroze School of Music as well as with private music teachers. She attended both the University of Wisconsin-Madison and the University of Nebraska–Lincoln and has a master's degree in Theater and Music. Lewis has taught voice classes and lectured at the Liverpool Institute for Performing Arts, University of California, Berkeley, Musicians Institute in Hollywood, Blue Bear School of Music, Santa Monica College, National Academy of Songwriters, and UCLA.

Career

The Singer's Workshop
Lewis founded a series of workshops, classes as well as private voice lessons called The Singer’s Workshop in Los Angeles. She has been training recording artists since 1983. In 2012 Lewis worked with Grammy winning singer, Miguel. Lewis appeared as vocal coach on CBS’s Rockstar: Supernova and MTV’s Rock The Cradle. She has also appeared as a commentator on TV Guide Network’s Idol Chat, VH1’s Dice: Undisputed, and Miss America: Reality Check.

 Client List

 Miguel
 Rihanna
 Britney Spears
 Bryson Tiller,
 Iggy Azalea
 Courtney Love
 Gwen Stefani
 The All-American Rejects
 Demi Lovato
 Jack Black
 Meaghan Martin
 Kate Voegele
 Motion City Soundtrack
 The Bravery
 The Pussycat Dolls
 Colbie Caillat
 Jimmy Eat World
 Metro Station
 Priyanka Chopra
 Carolina Liar
 Boys Like Girls

Author
Lewis is the author of The Singer’s First Aid Kit and The Pop Singer’s Warm-Up. Both books not only focus on exercises and information
to train his/her voice, but expand upon the challenges that professional singers face.

Notes

Voice teachers
American vocal coaches
Musicians from Los Angeles
Living people
Year of birth missing (living people)
Academics of the Liverpool Institute for Performing Arts
Singers from California